Chea Song-joo (Hangul:채송주) (born August 19, 1998) is a South Korean figure skater. She finished 13th at the 2015 Four Continents Championships.

Career

2014–15 season
Chea competed at the 2014 Lombardia Trophy, obtaining the minimum TES for Four Continents. Back in Korea, she ranked 4th at the qualification event, the KSU President Cup Ranking Competition, which gives her the spot to compete at the 2015 Four Continents Championships to be held in Seoul, South Korea.

2015 Four Continents is first ISU competition for her. She got her personal best scores in short, free-skate and the combined total at 2015 Four Continents

2015–16 season
Chea competed at the JGP qualification competition held in South Korea and placed 5th place with total score 144.71, so she was given a spot for the JGP series.

Chea placed 13th at her JGP in Toruń, Poland. At the 2015 Volvo Open Cup, she placed 11th in the short program, 8th in the free skate, and 8th overall.

Programs

Competitive highlights
CS: Challenger Series; JGP: Junior Grand Prix

Detailed results

 Personal best highlighted in bold.

References

External links

 
 2014 South Korean Figure Skating Championships results: 1st Day 2nd Day 3rd Day

1998 births
Living people
South Korean female single skaters
People from Goyang
Sportspeople from Gyeonggi Province